Obala Foundation is a U.S. based IRS code 501(c)(3) tax exempt non-profit organization that began as a forum for addressing what many have appreciated as the vast health care and resource gap between sub-Saharan Africa and the rest of the known world.

With 195 million people, Nigeria is Africa's most populous country. There are many things that make it a challenging place to engage. However, if only for the sheer number of people that stands to be affected by successful policy interventions, it would be almost irresponsible for any proponent of "global health" to ignore this country where 90% of the population subsists on less than two dollars per day.

In 2006 two physicians at the Brigham and Women's Hospital in Boston surveying the Nigerian health care system found that whereas health care infrastructure remains underdeveloped, there was a concurrent epidemic of resource under-utilization compounding the disadvantage.  They formed the group drawing from intellectual resources at Harvard Medical School and surroundings to address these issues.

This group differs from other traditional NGOs in that its primary focus is on resource optimization. The belief is that this approach which requires building infrastructure or testing its integrity is the surest path to sustainability.

Some of their current projects include efforts to leverage recent availability of mobile phones as the telecommunications platform for an Emergency/urgent care response system. As of 2009 their work is primarily being conducted in Lagos, Abuja and Jos, Nigeria.

References 

Medical and health foundations in the United States